Pectolinarin is a Cirsium isolate with anti-inflammatory activity and similar in chemical structure to linarin.

External links

Flavones